Percy Heylyn Currey FRIBA (November 1864 – 5 March 1942) was an English architect based in Derby.

Life

He was born in November 1864, the son of Benjamin Scott Currey and Helen Heygate. He was educated at Derby School from 1875 to 1883, and was awarded the Rowland Scholarship in 1878.

He married Augusta Mary Anne Emily Frederieka Leacroft on 26 September 1897 in Little Eaton, Derbyshire.

From 1895 he was Diocesan Surveyor to the Diocese of Southwell.

From 1903 he was in partnership with Charles Clayton Thompson, as Currey and Thompson. In 1907 he was made a Fellow of the Royal Institute of British Architects.

Works

St Stephen's Church, Borrowash 1890
Derby School Chapel, site adjoining St. Helen's House, King Street, Derby 1891 (Demolished Sept 2017)
St Luke’s Vicarage, 48 Bedford Street, Derby 1896
St Paul’s Church, Mansfield Road, Derby 1897 (addition of aisle)
St Giles' Church, Matlock 1898 (addition of south chapel)
St. Mary's Church, Westwood 1899
28 Loudon Street, Derby 1903 (for Edward Litchford, Midland Railway Chief Accountant)
Christ Church, Holloway, Derbyshire 1903 (tower 1911)
All Saints' Church, Ashover 1903 restoration
St Osmund’s Church, vicarage and almshouses in Osmaston-by-Derby 1904
Repton House, Church Street, Lea 1905
St Mary's Church, Plumtree 1906 (tower restoration)
St Peter and St Paul's Church, Eckington 1907 remodelling
St Helen's Church, Darley Dale 1908 restoration
St Mary's Church, Ilkeston 1910 restoration
Rose Hill Infants and St James’ Church of England Junior School 1913
St Mary, Buxton 1915 - their finest church
Fressingfield, 116 Blagreaves Lane, Derby 1914 (extended 1924)
St Bartholomew’s Church, Nightingale Road, Derby 1927
St Stephen’s Church, Sinfin 1935

References

1864 births
1942 deaths
Architects from Derbyshire
People educated at Derby School
Fellows of the Royal Institute of British Architects